The Michaelis–Becker reaction is the reaction of a hydrogen phosphonate with a base, followed by a nucleophilic substitution of phosphorus on a haloalkane, to give an alkyl phosphonate. Yields of this reaction are often lower than the corresponding Michaelis–Arbuzov reaction.

Further reading

References

Organic reactions
Name reactions